Hassell Creek  is a stream in Hickman County, Tennessee, in the United States.

Sources differ on the matter of for whom Hassell Creek was named. It may have been named for Zabulon Hassell, a pioneer who settled at the creek after 1806, or for "Black Jack" Hassell, a local moonshiner and politician.

See also
List of rivers of Tennessee

References

Rivers of Hickman County, Tennessee
Rivers of Tennessee